Suleymanov / Süleymanov / Suleimanov or Suleymanova / Süleymanova / Suleimanova (feminine) is a common surname. The surname is derived from the islamic male given name Suleyman.

 Abubakar Suleymanov (born 1991), Russian boxer
 Elin Suleymanov (born 1970), Azerbaijani ambassador
 Elkhan Suleymanov (born 1974), Azerbaijani weightlifter
 Elmira Süleymanova (born 1937), Azerbaijani chemist
 Idris Suleymanov (1915–1986), Hero of the Soviet Union
 Magomed Suleimanov (1976–2015), Dagestani islamist
 Magomed-Shapi Suleymanov (born 1999), Russian footballer
 Manaf Suleymanov (1912–2001), Azerbaijani writer, translator, and historian
 Nargiz Süleymanova (born 2004), German figure skater
 Nazim Suleymanov (born 1965), Soviet and Azerbaijani footballer
 Nijat Suleymanov (born 1998), Azerbaijani footballer
 Nikita Suleymanov (born 2001), Russian footballer
 Rashit Suleymanov (born 1950), Uzbek sculptor
 Renart Suleymanov (born 1937), Soviet sport shooter
 Renat Suleymanov (born 1965), Russian politician
 Sanan Suleymanov (born 1996), Azerbaijani Greco-Roman wrestler
 Servin Suleimanov (born 1980), Ukrainian boxer
 Timur Suleymanov (born 2000), Russian footballer
 Tunzala Suleymanova (1987), Azerbaijani footballer
 Vladimir Suleimanov (born 1985), Russian footballer

See also
Suleiman

Surnames from given names